The Kaysanites were a Shi'i sect of Islam that formed from the followers of Al-Mukhtar. They traced Imamate from Muhammad ibn al-Hanafiyyah and his descendants. The name Kaysaniyya was most likely derived from the name of Mukhtar's chief guard, Abu Amra Kaysan.

Etymology
The followers of Al-Mukhtar who emerged from his movement (including all subsequent sub-sects which evolved from his movement) who firstly upheld the Imamate of Muhammad ibn al-Hanafiyyah and his descendants or any other designated successors were initially named the "Mukhtariyya" (after Al-Mukhtar), but were soon more commonly referred to as the "Kaysānīyya" (i.e. Kaysanites). 

The name "Kaysānīyya" must have been based on the "kunya" (surname) Kaysān, allegedly given to al-Mukhtar by Ali, or the name of a freed mawlā of ʿAli who was killed at the Battle of Siffin called Kaysān, from whom it is claimed Al-Mukhtar acquired his ideas. Similarly, it may be named after Abu Amra Kaysan, a prominent mawālī and chief of al-Mukhtar’s personal bodyguard. Others claim that either ʿAli or Ibn al-Ḥanafiya named al-Mukhtar ‘Kaysān,’ because of his ingeniousness.

Beliefs
The Kaysanites as a collective sect held the following common beliefs:
They condemned the first three Caliphs before Ali as illegitimate usurpers and also held that the community had gone astray by accepting their rule.
They believed Ali and his three sons Hasan ibn Ali, Husayn ibn Ali and Muhammad ibn al-Hanafiyyah were the successive Imams and successors to Muhammad by divine appointment and that they were endowed with supernatural attributes.
They believed that Muhammad ibn al-Hanafiyyah was the Mahdi.
They believed in Bada’.
 The Dualist Zoroastrian sub-sect Mazdakism influenced Kaysanite beliefs.

Furthermore, some Kaysanite sub-sects established their own unique beliefs, such as:
Some believed that Muhammad ibn al-Hanafiyyah was concealed (ghayba) at Mount Radwa near Medina, guarded by lions and tigers and fed by mountain goats and would return (raj'a, i.e., the return to life of the Mahdi with his supporters for retribution before the Qiyama) as the Mahdi.
Some referred to dar al-taqiyya (i.e. the domain of Taqiyya) as those territories that were not their own. Their own territories were referred to as dar al-‘alaniya (i.e. the domain of publicity).
Some began to use ideas of a generally Gnostic nature which were current in Iraq during the 8th century.
Some interpreted Muhammad ibn al-Hanafiyyah’s temporary banishment to Mount Radwa and concealment as chastisement for his mistake of travelling from Mecca to Damascus to pledge allegiance and pay a visit to the false Caliph Abd al-Malik ibn Marwan.

History

Shia Islam and Kaysanites
The Kaysanites pursued an activist anti-establishment policy against the Umayyads, aiming to transfer leadership of the Muslims to Alids and accounted for the allegiance of the bulk of the Shi'a populace (even overshadowing the Imamis) until shortly after the Abbasid revolution. Initially they broke away from the religiously moderate attitudes of the early Kufan Shi'a. Most of the Kaysanites support came from superficially Islamicized Mawalis in southern Iraq, Persia and elsewhere, as well as other supporters in Iraq, particularly in Kufa and Al-Mada'in (Ctesiphon).

Following the death of Muhammad ibn al-Hanafiyyah, the bulk of the Kaysanites acknowledged the Imamate of Abd-Allah ibn Muhammad ibn al-Hanafiyyah (a.k.a. Abu Hashim, the eldest son of Muhammad ibn al-Hanafiyyah, d. 716). This sub-sect (a.k.a. Hashimiyya, named after Abu Hashim), which comprised the majority of the Kaysanites was the earliest Shi'ite group whose teachings and revolutionary stance were disseminated in Persia, especially in Greater Khorasan, where it found adherents among the Mawalis and Arab settlers.

By the end of the Umayyad period the majority of the Hashimiyya, transferred their allegiance to the Abbasid family and they played an important role in the propaganda campaign that eventually led to the successful Abbasid revolution.

However, the Kaysanites did not survive as a sect, even though they occupied a majority position among the Shi'a until shortly after the Abbasid revolution. The remaining Kaysanites who had not joined the Abbasid party sought to align themselves with alternative Shi'a communities. Therefore, in Khurasan and other eastern lands many joined the Khurramites. In Iraq they joined Ja'far al-Sadiq or Muhammad al-Nafs al-Zakiyya, who were then the main Alid claimants to the Imamate. However, with the demise of the activist movement of al-Nafs az-Zakiyya, Ja'far al-Sadiq emerged as their main rallying point. Hence, by the end of the 8th century the majority of the Kaysanites had turned to other Imams.

Kaysanite sub-sects
The Kaysanite Shi'a sect split into numerous sub-sects throughout its history. These splits would occur after a Kaysanite leader died and his followers would divide by pledging their allegiance to different leaders, with each sub-sect claiming the authenticity of its own leader.

When Muhammad ibn al-Hanafiyyah died in 700 the Kaysanites split into at least three distinct sub-sects:
Karibiyya or Kuraybiyya, named after their leader Abu Karib (or Kurayb) al-Darir. They  refused to acknowledge Muhammad ibn al-Hanafiyyah’s death and believed he was concealed (gha’ib) in the Radwa Mountains near Medina, from whence he would eventually emerge as the Mahdi to fill the earth with justice and equity, as it had formerly been filled with injustice and oppression.
Another sub-sect was under the leadership of a man named Hayyan al-Sarraj. They affirmed the death of Muhammad ibn al-Hanafiyyah, but maintained that he and his partisans would return to life in the future when he would establish justice on earth.
Another sub-sect founded by Hamza ibn ‘Umara al-Barbari asserted divinity for Muhammad ibn al-Hanafiyyah and prophethood for Hamza ibn ‘Umara al-Barbari and acquired some supporters in Kufa and Medina.
Another sub-sect was the Hashimiyya. The Hashimiyya comprised the majority of the Kaysanites after the death of Muhammad ibn al-Hanafiyyah. They accepted Muhammad ibn al-Hanafiyyah’s death and recognized his eldest son Abu Hashim as his successor. The Hashimiyya believed that Abu Hashim was personally designated by Muhammad ibn al-Hanafiyyah as his successor. Therefore, Abu Hashim became the Imam of the majority of the Shi'a of that time even though he was slightly younger than his cousin Zayn al-Abidin. From their Kufa base, the Hashimiyya managed to recruit adherents in other provinces, especially among the Mawali in Khurasan.

After the death of Abu Hashim, no less than four to five sub-sects claimed succession to Abu Hashim from the original Hashimiyya: 
The Harbiyya, which would later be known as the Janahiyya, were the followers of Abdallah ibn Mu'awiya ibn Abdallah ibn Ja'far. Abdullah ibn Muawiya was Abu Hashim’s cousin and the grandson of Ja`far ibn Abī Tālib. According to the Harbiyya/Janahiyya, he was the legitimate successor of Abu Hashim.  He revolted after the death of his cousin Zayd ibn Ali and his nephew Yahya ibn Zayd ibn Ali. His revolt spread through Iraq into Isfahan and Fārs from 744 to 748. He was also joined by the Zaidiyyah, Abbasids, and Kharijites in revolt. For a while, Abdallah ibn Muawiya established himself at Estakhr from where he ruled for a few years over Fārs and other parts of Persia, including Ahvaz, Jibal, Isfahan and Kerman from 744 to 748 until fleeing to Khurasan from the advancing Umayyad forces. When fleeing to Khurasan, he was killed (on behalf of the Abbasids) by Abu Muslim Khorasani in 748 while imprisoned. The Harbiyya/Janahiyya sub-sect expounded many extremist and Gnostic ideas such as the pre-existence of souls as shadows (azilla), the transmigration of souls (tanaukh al-arwah i.e. the return in a different body while having the same spirit) and a cyclical history of eras (adwar) and eons (akwar). Some of these ideas were adopted by other early Shi'a Ghulat groups.
After the death of Abdallah ibn Mu'awiya, a sub-sect of the Harbiyya/Janahiyya claimed that he was alive and hiding in the mountains of Isfahan.
Another sub-sect of the Hashimiyya recognized the Abbasid Muhammad ibn Ali ibn Abdallah ibn ‘Abbas ibn ‘Abd al-Muttalib as the legitimate successor of Abu Hashim. This Abbasid sub-sect comprised the majority of the original Hashimiyya. The Abbasids alleged that Abu Hashim (who died childless in 716) had named his successor to be Muhammad ibn Ali ibn Abdullah (d. 744). Muhammad ibn Ali ibn Abdullah became the founder of the Abbasid Caliphate. He had a brother named Ibrahim (who was killed by the Umayyads); and two sons As-Saffah (who became the first Abbasid Caliph) and Al-Mansur (who became the second Abbasid Caliph).  Therefore, the ideological engine of the Abbasid revolt was that of the Kaysanites.
Another sub-sect was the Abu Muslimiyya sub-sect (named after Abu Muslim Khorasani). This sub-sect maintained that the Imamate had passed from As-Saffah to Abu Muslim. They also believed that Al-Mansur did not kill Abu Muslim, but instead someone who resembled Abu Muslim and that Abu Muslim was still alive.
Another sub-sect was the Rizamiyya. They refused to repudiate Abu Muslim, but also affirmed that the Imamate would remain in the Abbasid family until the Qiyama, when a descendant of ‘Abbas ibn ‘Abd al-Muttalib would be the Mahdi.

See also
Islamic schools and branches
List of extinct Shi'a sects

References

Bibliography

External links
Kaysanite Imams family tree, pg.20

Shia Islamic branches
Medieval Islamic world